Futz! is a Canadian animated series created by Vadim Kapridov and produced by 9 Story Entertainment for broadcast on Teletoon. The show's premise revolves around the eponymous main character and his zany adventures. Eschewing verbal dialogue, the series portrays the escapades of this character, who has been described as an anti-hero, in a comedic light.

Episodes

The show consists of 26 episodes of 3 minutes each. Australian airdates are provided for ABC1 or ABC2 depending on the episode; repeats of the series have also aired on ABC3. Episodes are provided in the Canadian order.

Production 
The series is based on a web animation that appeared on United Feature Syndicate's website, Comics.com, where they posted a series of Flash cartoons called Mr. Futz in 2001. It was later picked up for television, with development beginning in 2002, with production commencing in December 2006 and ending on schedule in September 2007.

Original plans for the series called for full scripts with dialogue, including unproduced episodes written by Andrew Nicholls and Darrell Vickers.

Broadcast 
Futz! was first shown on Teletoon as a sneak peek on August 24 in 2007 and began airing regularly on September 3, 2007, ending on January 6, 2008 after 26 episodes. It also aired in Australia on ABC from April 14, 2008 to October 20, 2008 and was set to air on several other channels worldwide. On Teletoon, it has aired as an interstitial program following movies presented on the channel.

Reception

References 

Canadian children's animated comedy television series
Teletoon original programming
2000s Canadian animated television series
Television series by 9 Story Media Group
2007 Canadian television series debuts
2008 Canadian television series endings
Canadian flash animated television series
English-language television shows
Animated television series without speech